Parker Peak is a peak of the Walker Mountains rising at the base of Evans Peninsula on Thurston Island. It was delineated from air photos taken by U.S. Navy Squadron VX-6 in January 1960. It was named by the Advisory Committee on Antarctic Names (US-ACAN) for Alton N. Parker, an aviation pilot of the Byrd Antarctic Expedition in 1928–30.

See also
 Mountains in Antarctica

Maps
 Thurston Island – Jones Mountains. 1:500000 Antarctica Sketch Map. US Geological Survey, 1967.
 Antarctic Digital Database (ADD). Scale 1:250000 topographic map of Antarctica. Scientific Committee on Antarctic Research (SCAR). Since 1993, regularly upgraded and updated.

References
 

Mountains of Ellsworth Land
Thurston Island